This is a list of localities in Waikato as defined by government agency Statistics New Zealand in 2013, listed by the territorial authorities to which each locality belongs. Waikato is a region of New Zealand in the central North Island which reaches from coast to coast and from Coromandel Peninsula in the north to Lake Taupo and King Country in the south. Many boundaries and names were changed in the 2018 census. It is bordered by Auckland to the north, Bay of Plenty to the east, and Taranaki, Manawatū-Whanganui and Hawke's Bay to the south.

Thames-Coromandel District

The Thames-Coromandel District is located in the area around the Firth of Thames and Coromandel Peninsula, to the southeast of Auckland. At the 2006 Census, Thames-Coromandel had 25,941 people (including 4,020 self-identified Maori) and 22,704 occupied dwellings. The district council is seated in the district's largest town, Thames, and was constituted before any other district council in 1975. Thames is located in the southwest of the district; the other major settlements are Whitianga in the northeast and Whangamatā in the southeast.

Hauraki District

Waikato District

Matamata-Piako District

Hamilton City

Waipa District

Ōtorohanga District

South Waikato District

Waitomo District

Taupo District

Rotorua District

Area outside territorial authority

References